Cho Yoon-Kyoung is an interdisciplinary researcher involved in basic science to translational research in microfluidics and nanomedicine. She is a group leader in the Center for Soft and Living Matter at the Institute for Basic Science (IBS) and a full professor in Biomedical Engineering at the Ulsan National Institute of Science and Technology (UNIST), Ulsan, Korea. Cho is a member of the National Academy of Engineering of Korea and a Fellow of the Royal Society of Chemistry.

Education
Cho majored in chemical engineering at the Pohang University of Science and Technology (POSTECH) graduating with B.S. and M.S. in 1992 and 1994, respectively. She completed her Ph.D. in materials science and engineering at the University of Illinois at Urbana–Champaign in 1999, her advisor was Steve Granick.

Career
She worked at the Samsung Advanced Institute of Technology as a senior researcher from 1999 until 2008 where she participated in developing in vitro diagnostic devices with biomedical applications.

Joining the Ulsan National Institute of Science and Technology (UNIST) in 2008, she became the chair of the School of Nano-Bioscience and Chemical Engineering (2008–2014) and later the chair of the School of Life Sciences (2014–2015) and the director of World Class University (2009–2013) and Brain Korea 21 (2013–2015) programs. She has been a group leader in the Institute for Basic Science Center for Soft and Living Matter since 2015. From 2016, she is a full professor in the Department of Biomedical Engineering in UNIST

She has been an associate editor of Lab on a Chip from 2019 and previously served as an editorial board member (2013-2019). She also has been an advisory board member for Analyst and an editorial board member for Micromachines. In addition, she has been a board member of the Chemical and Biological Microsystems Society (CBMS).

She served as a member for Presidential Advisory Council on Science & Technology  (2018) and advisory committee member for the Ministry of Personnel Management (2018).

Research and achievements
Much of Cho's research has focused on centrifugal microfluidics. Cho and her team have developed lab-on-a-disc systems to provide a “sample-in and answer-out” type biochemical analysis solution with simple, size-reduced, and cost-efficient instrumentation. She demonstrated fully integrated virus enrichment and nucleic acids extraction on a chip, fully automated immunoassay, label-free isolation of circulating tumor cells, size fractionization of extracellular vesicles (EVs), RNA detection from urinary EVs, and electricity-free bacteria enrichment for urinary tract infection detection and rapid antimicrobial susceptibility test by directly testing clinical samples of patients, which allows high precision detection of biomarkers for monitoring the efficacy of therapy and emergent drug resistance for personalized medicine. In 2021, her research team was the first to program exosomes for the purpose of energy generation in living cells.

The other key area of Cho's research concerns microfluidic systems to understand intercellular communication. Biomimetic chips such as platelet chips or 3D human liver-on-a-chip have been designed to study the roles of EVs in cancer metastasis. She investigated morphological adaptations and mechanobiological behaviors of epithelial cells on a torus surface. In addition, her group is interested in nanomaterials, nanodevices, and nanofluidics which can provide nonconventional tools and platforms to enhance biosensing characteristics or to investigate physical, chemical, and biological properties of living matter.

Awards and honors
Cho was elected Member of the National Academy of Engineering of Korea in 2020. She is a Fellow of Royal Society of Chemistry. Her work has been recognized by multiple awards, including National Top 100 R&D Performances (2019), Korea's Top 5 Bio-field research outcome (2017, 2020), Faculty of the Year Award (UNIST, 2012 and 2020), Korean Woman Engineer of the Year (2010), SAMSUNG CEO's Award for Best Technology Achievement of the Year (2004, 2007), the Racheff Award for Outstanding Graduate Research (UIUC, 1998), and invited lectures at the Nobel Symposium on Microfluidics in Sweden (2017), and plenary seminar at microTAS 2010.

Selected publications

References

External links
FRUITS Lab (Fluids & Reactions Using Integrative Technology & Science Lab

Yoon-Kyoung Cho - Bioengineering - Nature Research
조윤경 대학교수 - Naver 인물검색
Lab on a Disc, Setting the Foundation for Diagnosing Diseases

Living people
Fellows of the Royal Society of Chemistry
Institute for Basic Science
21st-century South Korean women scientists
21st-century South Korean scientists
Year of birth missing (living people)
South Korean scientists